Rajasthan State Archives is an archive located in Bikaner city of Rajasthan state in India. It has a rich collection of administrative record of the Mughal period like Persian Farmans, Nishans, Manshurs, Akbarat, Vakil Report, Arzdasht, Khatoot and records created during administration of the Princely states of Rajasthan such as Bahiat, Pattas, Parwanas, Rukkas, Chithiat etc. The researchers can use facilities like microfilming, reference library and research rooms provided by the institute. A record gallery has been set up for the tourists too which displays important documents of administrative, social, economical and historical value. The archives' headquarters are in Bikaner and there are branches in seven cities of the state.

External links
The website is

References
[Handbook of libraries, archives and information centres in India By B M. Gupta]
[Rajasthan State Archives: an introduction By Rajasthan State Archives]

Archives in India
History of Rajasthan
Museums in Rajasthan
Research institutes in Rajasthan
Indology
Tourist attractions in Bikaner
State agencies of Rajasthan
Year of establishment missing